The International Political Science Association (IPSA), founded under the auspices of UNESCO in 1949, is an international scholarly association. IPSA is devoted to the advancement of political science in all parts of the world. During its history it has helped build bridges between East and West, North and South, and has promoted collaboration between scholars in both established and emerging democracies. Its aim is to create a global political science community in which all can participate, most recently it has been extending its reach in Eastern Europe and Latin America. IPSA has consultative status with the Economic and Social Council of the United Nations (ECOSOC), with the United Nations Educational Scientific and Cultural Council (UNESCO) and it is a member of the International Social Science Council and of the Global Development Network.

History
Since its beginning, national political science associations have constituted its core. Its founder members included American, Canadian, French and Indian political science associations. By 1960, 24 more national associations had joined up. Since then, collective membership has been expanding at a steady pace. Today, 54 national associations are collective members of IPSA. Each collective member is represented on IPSA's central governing organ, the council. The council lays down broad policy guidelines for the association and elects the executive committee, which is responsible for the conduct of IPSA's affairs between congresses.

Individual and associate membership was introduced in the early 1950s. Starting with 52 members in 1952, IPSA's individual membership now stands at more than 3,400 members. The association has worked hard to increase the involvement of women, who now make up more than a third of the membership. Associate membership is open to institutions engaged in research or teaching in the area of political science and is hovering at around 110 institutions worldwide.

Mission
The special mandate of IPSA, expressed in its Constitution, is to support the development of political science in all parts of the world, building academic networks linking East and West, North and South. Its aim is to create an inclusive and global political science community in which all can participate. It seeks to promote collaboration between scholars in emerging and established democracies and to support the academic freedoms needed for the social sciences to flourish.

The activities and policies of IPSA reflect its global mission. It has been highly successful in the encouragement of national political science associations and today there are over 50 such associations affiliated with IPSA. IPSA has maintained its links with the United Nations and has supported the development of other international and regional political science organizations.

IPSA World Congresses of Political Science are now held every second year, moving between continents. The participation of scholars from less developed countries is supported through travel grants and the Global South Solidarity Fund. IPSA's research committees offer opportunities for political scientists working in particular sub-fields of the discipline to associate with colleagues from around the world. Organizing events between World Congresses and playing a major role in these Congresses, the research committees encourage the worldwide pooling of skills and resources by working both together and in conjunction with specialist sub-groups of national associations.

IPSA publications, including the lead journal International Political Science Review, the International Political Science Abstracts, World Political Science, Participation, and the IPSA Portal, also seek to meet the needs of political scientists in different parts of the world. As part of IPSA's global mission to support and promote political science, it now conducts summer schools in research methods across the globe, for example, in South America and South Africa.

IPSA strives to ensure balanced representation in terms of region, gender and stage of career in all its activities – for example, the creation of a new research committee must be supported by political scientists from at least seven countries and two continents. Conference panels and roundtables are expected to display similar diversity, with representation from more than one continent and at least four countries.

By linking scholars from North and South as well as East and West, IPSA seeks to strengthen the networks that underpin a global political science community. Such linkages put political science in a stronger position to contribute to the quality of public deliberation and decision-making as well as to the understanding of an increasingly interconnected political world. Ultimately, IPSA supports the role of political science in empowering men and women to participate more effectively in political life, whether within or beyond the states in which they live.

Academic activities
IPSA's academic activities fall under three main headings: 1) organizing biennial world congresses as well as regular events between congresses; 2) promoting research in political science, notably through a wide-reaching network of research committees (RCs); and 3) disseminating research and information through a range of publications.
IPSA's principal academic activity is the biennial congress. Starting in 1950 and 1952, world congresses have since been taking place every three years. From small beginnings, they have developed into major international scientific occasions, typically attracting about 2000 participants. As of 2012, world congresses are held every other year. In addition to these major events, IPSA sponsors other types of scholarly meetings such as conferences, roundtables and workshops.

Since the 1970s, one of the most dynamic areas of growth within IPSA has been the activity of its RCs. In addition to organizing panels at the triennial congresses, RCs organize their own meetings between congresses, publish newsletters and issue other publications. IPSA now has 49 active RCs with interests ranging from political finance to gender and language politics and comparative democratization.

List of Research Committees
 
 RC01 - Concepts and Methods
 RC02 - Political Elites
 RC03 - European Unification
 RC05 - Comparative Studies on Local Government and Politics
 RC06 - Political Sociology
 RC07 - Women and Politics in the Global South
 RC08 - Legislative Specialists
 RC09 - Comparative Judicial Studies
 RC10 - Electronic Democracy
 RC11 - Science and Politics
 RC12 - Biology and Politics
 RC13 - Democratization in Comparative Perspective
 RC14 - Politics and Ethnicity
 RC15 - Political and Cultural Geography
 RC16 - Socio-Political Pluralism
 RC17 - Comparative Public Opinion
 RC18 - Asian and Pacific Studies
 RC19 - Gender Politics and Policy
 RC20 - Political Finance and Political Corruption
 RC21 - Political Socialization and Education
 RC22 - Political Communication
 RC23 - Elections, Citizens and Parties
 RC24 - Armed Forces and Society
 RC25 - Comparative Health Policy
 RC26 - Human Rights
 RC27 - Structure and Organization of Government
 RC28 - Comparative Federalism and Multilevel Governance
 RC29 - Psycho-Politics
 RC30 - Comparative Public Policy
 RC31 - Political Philosophy
 RC32 - Public Policy and Administration
 RC33 - The Study of Political Science as a Discipline
 RC34 - Quality of Democracy
 RC35 - Technology and Development
 RC36 - Political Power
 RC37 - Rethinking Political Development
 RC38 - Politics and Business
 RC39 - Welfare States and Developing Societies
 RC40 - New World Orders?
 RC41 - Geopolitics
 RC42 - Security, Integration and Unification
 RC43 - Religion and Politics
 RC44 - Military's Role in Democratization
 RC45 - Quantitative International Politics
 RC47 - Local-Global Relations
 RC48 - Administrative Culture
 RC49 - Socialism, Capitalism and Democracy
 RC50 - The Politics of Language
 RC51 - International Political Economy

Summer schools
IPSA offers summer schools in São Paulo, Brazil (since 2010), Stellenbosch, South Africa (2011-2013), Singapore (since 2012), Ankara, Turkey (since 2013), and Mexico (since 2016). IPSA summer schools are intended to give social sciences scholars access to high-quality advanced training in qualitative and quantitative social science and political science research methods.

Publishing
IPSA's extensive publishing program has included International Political Science Abstracts (IPSA) (1951–present); International Political Science Review (1980–present) and the bulletin of the association, Participation.(1977–). More recently, IPSA has offered an online publication, IPSAPortal, which provides ratings and links for the top 300 web sites for political science worldwide. Finally, IPSA offers a monthly information email called Newsletter. Since 2014, IPSA also publishes World Political Science, in collaboration with De Gruyter.

Awards
The association awards various scholarly awards to leading scholars in the field, including the Karl Deutsch Award.
 Karl Deutsch Award
 Prize of the Foundation Mattei Dogan awarded by the International Political Science Association for High Achievement in Political Science
 Stein Rokkan Award
 Francesco Kjellberg Award for Outstanding Papers Presented by New Scholars
 Wilma Rule Award: IPSA Award for the Best Paper on Gender and Politics
 Global South Award
 Meisel-Laponce Award
 APSA-IPSA Theodore J. Lowi First Book Award
 RC01 Award for Concept Analysis in Political Science
 RC01 Best C&M Working Paper Award
 RC27 Charles H. Levine Memorial Book Prize
 RC27 Ulrich Kloeti Award

List of World Congresses and Presidents

IPSA Secretaries General
 François Goguel, FNSP, Paris (1949–1950)
 Jean Meynaud, FNSP, Paris (1950–1955)
 John Goormaghtigh, Brussels (1955–1960)
 Serge Hurtig, FNSP, Paris (1960–1967)
 André Philippart, Carnegie Endowment, Brussels (1967–1976)
 John Trent, University of Ottawa (1976–1988)
 Francesco Kjellberg, University of Oslo (1988–1994)
 John Coakley, University College Dublin (1994–2000)
 Guy Lachapelle , Concordia University (2000–)

References

External links

International professional associations
Political science organizations
Members of the International Science Council